Silantyevo is a rural locality (a selo) and the administrative centre of Silantyevsky Selsoviet, Birsky District, Bashkortostan, Russia. The population was 677 as of 2010. There are 10 streets.

Geography 
Silantyevo is located 12 km south of Birsk (the district's administrative centre) by road. Nikolsky is the nearest rural locality.

References 

Rural localities in Birsky District